Phoenix Ancient Art, located in Geneva, New York City and Brussels, is a second-generation antiquities dealer specializing in Greek and Roman ancient art.  Its works of art have been purchased by arts and antiquities private collectors as well as museums such as New York's Metropolitan Museum of Art and the Louvre Museum in Paris. They have historically dealt in antiquities from the Sumerian art and Ancient Roman artistic traditions, as well as from Ancient Greek and Ancient Egyptian civilizations.

Notable Collections

Phoenix Ancient Art has facilitated numerous museum acquisitions of seminal ancient art objects.

Noteworthy sales and provenances from Phoenix include:
 The Apollo Sauroctonos, known also as the Lizard or Python Slayer, currently attributed to Praxiteles, at the Cleveland Museum of Art
 Bust of Isis from the 25th Dynasty (750–656 B.C) in Egypt, and Aryballos in the form of a female bust, early 6th century B.C., both at Princeton Museum of Art
 Ka-Nefer-Nefer at the Saint Louis Art Museum
 Bronze Statue of a Man, ca. mid-2nd to 1st century B.C., Greek, and Marble two-sided relief, 1st century A.D., Roman, the Metropolitan Museum of Art
 Eye idol (larger), late 4th millennium B.C., stone, Yale University Art Gallery
 The private collection of Harvard University molecular biologist and Nobel Laureate Walter Gilbert

Background

Family History
Phoenix Ancient Art was founded by the Lebanese businessman Sleiman Aboutaam in 1968 and incorporated in 1995. The business continues today under the leadership of his son, Ali Aboutaam, and his son, Hicham Aboutaam has his own New York based gallery, Electrum.

Ali and Hicham were born in Beirut in 1965 and 1967 respectively. In the 1980s, at the height of the Lebanese Civil War, Ali was kidnapped by a Syrian gang and held hostage until Sleiman procured his release. Following the incident, the family (Sleiman, Souad, the boys and their sister Noura) relocated to Geneva, Switzerland, where they continue to operate a branch of the business today.

In the early 90s, the young men earned a formidable reputation as buyers. Nicknamed "Tall and Taller" by the socialite set (such as those attending events with art collector Leon Levy and his wife Shelby White), they were the awe and the fear of fellow industry players.

In 1998, the brothers assumed control of the family business. The takeover would have been a natural succession, but it was marked by the sudden loss of Sleiman and Souad on Swissair Flight 111. The resilence demonstrated by the Hicham and Ali was staggering, and proved important through the changing tides of the antiquities market.

In 2003, Hicham Aboutaam was charged with a misdemeanor for falsifying customs documents on a ceremonial drinking vessel. He paid a fine of $5000, the vessel was seized by the authorities, and the customer received a refund.

In 2004, Ali Aboutaam was tried in absentia in an Egyptian court as one of 25 defendants and sentenced to 15 years’ imprisonment. Aboutaam denied his affiliation with smuggling antiquities from Egypt. In 2008, an arrest warrant was lodged by Egyptian authorities with Interpol and Ali Aboutaam was detained in Bulgaria while on holiday, but was then released.

In 2023, Ali Aboutaam agreed to a plea bargain following a six-year investigation by the Geneva Police Tribunal for using forged documentation. He was given an 18-month suspended jail sentence with three years’ probation and had to pay about $488,000 in legal fees. Aboutaam’s lawyers assert that only 18 of the 15,000 antiquities, or 0.01%, requisitioned by the Swiss authorities lacked sufficient documentation. Aboutaam also stated that of all the pieces under investigation, none were proven to have been acquired illegally or stolen. As of January 2023, the court in Geneva had released all but 46 of the seized antiquities.

Events

In April 2009, Phoenix Ancient Art launched e-Tiquities.com, an e-commerce platform for a wide range of artworks, also including jewelry, figurines, amulets, sculpture and pottery from regions as diverse as ancient Greece and Rome, Byzantium, Egypt, the Near East and the Islamic world.

In early 2014, Phoenix Ancient Art opened a second gallery in Geneva called ‘Phoenix Ancient Art Young Collectors’, a unique gallery space that exhibits a large variety of objects from the 6th millennium B.C. through the 14th century A.D.

On June 12, 2019, Phoenix Ancient Art opened a new gallery in Brussels.

Fairs and Exhibitions
Phoenix Ancient Art participates in a number of international fairs, such as the Biennale des Antiquaires (Paris), the Brussels Antiques and Fine Art Fair BRAFA (Brussels), the International Fine Art and Antiques Show (New York City),  the PAD (London), the Point Art Fine Art Fair (Monaco), the Salon Art + Design (New York), the Spring Masters Fair (New York), and TEFAF (New York). They also hold local themed events in their galleries several times a year accompanied by their gallery publications.

Further reading
http://www.blouinartinfo.com/power-game-changers-2014#prettyPhoto[gallery6]/3/  
http://www.lefigaro.fr/arts-expositions/2014/09/18/03015-20140918ARTFIG00352-la-biennale-des-antiquaires-vu-par-le-dessinateur-francois-aviril.php
http://www.nytimes.com/2013/11/15/arts/design/the-salon-art-design-a-wide-range-at-park-avenue-armory.html?_r=1&
http://www.bilan.ch/etienne-dumont/courants-dart/geneve-splendeurs-antiques-chez-phoenix
http://www.handelsblatt.com/panorama/kunstmarkt/brafa-erfolgreiche-stilmischung-in-bruessel/7652422.html
http://www.nytimes.com/2012/08/13/arts/design/cleveland-museum-buys-antiquities-stirs-ethics-debates.html?pagewanted=all
http://archives.tdg.ch/phoenix-presente-geneve-temoignages-antiquite-2011-04-15
https://ssrn.com/abstract=2370731, paper "Phoenix Ancient Art and the Aboutaams in Hot Water Again" by Leila Amineddoleh
http://money.cnn.com/2008/10/23/magazines/fortune/antiquities_hira.fortune/index.htm, Really Old Money, October 23, 2008.
"New York Times" article "Do You Know Where That Art Has Been' by Ron Stodghil 
NBC News the Rich Spend During a Down Economy," quoting Mr. Aboutaam
Article in Forbes Magazine: "Ancient History for Sale", by Carrie Coolidge. The article also presents a photographic slideshow of antiquities from Phoenix Ancient Art.
"BusinessWeek" article "Antiquities to grow old with"
https://abcnews.go.com/International/IraqCoverage/story?id=2282183&page=1  The article reports how Hicham Aboutaam, Interpol, and ICE, successfully recovered the famous stolen statue of Entemena, which is "on the FBI top 10 list of art heists." 
 "Financial Times" article "Antiquities Weather the Market" FT article featuring the new era in the antiquities trade, Phoenix Ancient Art and a major Egyptian head of queen] 
"ArtNet" article "New Leaf for Aboutaams"
"New York Sun" article: "Antiquities Dealers Suddenly Emerge into the Sunlight" Article where Hicham Aboutaam discusses the changing scrutiny in the antiquities business
https://www.wsj.com/articles/new-york-court-declines-to-take-up-appeal-in-libel-case-against-dow-jones-11599093080 "Richard Emery, a lawyer for Mr. Aboutaam, said: “It is a travesty that The Wall Street Journal got away with a false, racist article that destroyed my client’s business.”

References

American art dealers